Navalmoral is a municipality located in the province of Ávila, Castile and León, Spain. According to the 2006 census (INE), the municipality has a population of 471 inhabitants.

References

Municipalities in the Province of Ávila